John Archibald Whyte (17 July 1919 – 1 October 1973) was a Scottish footballer who played as a centre half in the Football League for Barnsley and Oldham Athletic.

References

External links

1919 births
1973 deaths
Scottish footballers
Association football central defenders
Barnsley F.C. players
Oldham Athletic A.F.C. players
English Football League players
Armadale Thistle F.C. players
Footballers from Falkirk (council area)